Protosynaema eratopis is a species of moth in the family Plutellidae first described by Edward Meyrick in 1885. It is endemic to New Zealand.

References

Moths described in 1885
Moths of New Zealand
Plutellidae
Endemic fauna of New Zealand
Taxa named by Edward Meyrick
Endemic moths of New Zealand